Big Apple Township is an inactive township in Oregon County, in the U.S. state of Missouri.

Big Apple Township was so named on account of apple orchards within its borders.

References

Townships in Missouri
Townships in Oregon County, Missouri